Mooreville is the name of several localities:

Australia
Mooreville, New South Wales

United States
Mooreville, Michigan
Mooreville, Mississippi
Mooreville, Texas